Joshua Clottey (born October 6, 1977) is a Ghanaian former professional boxer who competed from 1995 to 2019, and held the IBF welterweight title from 2008 to 2009. As an amateur, he competed at the 1994 Commonwealth Games. At the peak of his career, he was notable for his exceptionally durable chin, and was never stopped in any of his five losses.

Early life
As a child in his native Ghana, Clottey had a passion for football, a sport that was also played by his father. Clottey moved and spent a few years in the United Kingdom then later to the United States.

Professional career

Welterweight
Clottey rose to prominence by winning his first twenty fights, including 14 by knockout. His performance set him up to fight Carlos Baldomir, in a title defense by Baldomir for the WBC international welterweight title.  Clottey was winning until the 10th round, where he was penalized two points for an intentional head butt.  After another clash of heads, Clottey was disqualified.

Clottey rebounded from the controversial loss by winning the African Boxing Union welterweight title in his next fight.  He then rolled off a 10 fight winning streak highlighted by his first win on American soil and capture of several minor welterweight and middleweight titles. The streak culminated in an IBF intercontinental welterweight title. On December 2, 2006, Clottey earned his first shot at a world title but broke his hand in the fourth round of his fight against World Boxing Organization champion Antonio Margarito. That bout against Margarito has since come under controversial suspicion following news reports (released after Margarito's fight with Shane Mosley) that Margarito had boxed opponents with hand wraps illegally loaded with plaster (along with Margarito's first bout with Miguel Cotto). On April 7, 2007 (following Clottey's questionable loss to Margarito), Clottey earned a unanimous decision over Diego Corrales, in what was Corrales's final fight before his death. In December 2007, Clottey positioned himself for another title shot with a win over prospect Shamone Alvarez. Clottey beat Zab Judah on August 2, 2008, for the IBF welterweight title vacated by Antonio Margarito.

Clottey vs. Cotto
On June 13, 2009, Clottey faced Miguel Cotto in New York City at Madison Square Garden for the WBO welterweight title. Cotto dropped Clottey in the first with a jab. Cotto was cut in the third round by an accidental head butt. Clottey's combinations throughout the fight gave Cotto problems. Cotto emerged the winner with a controversial split decision.

Clottey vs. Pacquiao: The Event

Clottey fought seven-division world champion Manny Pacquiao on March 13, 2010, in Arlington, Texas, at the Dallas Cowboys Stadium following the disagreement on terms of a proposed boxing match between Manny Pacquiao and Floyd Mayweather Jr. which would have been scheduled on the same date in Las Vegas, Nevada. Clottey lost to Pacquiao by unanimous decision.  Pacquiao threw a total of 1231 punches in the fight, missing 985 and landing 246. Clottey threw a total of 399 punches, 291 missed and 108 hit Manny. On November 19, 2011, after over a year away from the ring, Clottey returned to defeat Calvin Green via TKO in the second round. Since then however, Clottey confirmed that he'd retired from boxing to care for a sick relative.

Comeback
On August 23, 2013, Star Boxing announced Clottey's return to boxing as they have signed the former champion to a contract. Clottey returned to the ring on September 14, 2013, when he faced Dashon Johnson. Clottey defeated Johnson via unanimous decision. On April 9, 2014, Clottey went on to beat former middleweight champion Anthony Mundine, dropping Mundine five times. Clottey was in line to fight Canelo Alvarez in December 2014, but Canelo had to pull out due to an ankle injury. On December 19, 2015, Clottey faced Gabriel Rosado at a 158-lb catchweight. Despite having success and leading early in the fight, Clottey was outworked over ten rounds. He lost via unanimous decision. Clottey clarified in February 2018 that he has yet to retire in boxing. The most recent fight in which he won was against opponent Azziz Mponda from Tanzania. Clottey won by TKO in round 8.

Fighting style
A tough, orthodox fighter, Clottey has a balanced combination of size, speed, stamina, power, endurance, ring savvy, and a solid chin. In addition, he is an accurate, efficient puncher with effective countering ability. His defensive skills are top notch; he stands upright while holding his arms and gloves high to protect himself, which is similar to Winky Wright's defensive stance. As a result of his defensive prowess and ability to absorb a punch, he has never lost a bout via knockout.

Personal life
Born in Accra, Ghana, Clottey now lives in The Bronx, New York.

Professional boxing record

References

External links

1977 births
Living people
Light-middleweight boxers
African Boxing Union champions
International Boxing Federation champions
Ghanaian male boxers
Boxers from Accra
Ghanaian emigrants to the United States
Light-welterweight boxers
World welterweight boxing champions
Boxers at the 1994 Commonwealth Games
Commonwealth Games competitors for Ghana